Criminal Minds: Suspect Behavior is an American police procedural drama starring Forest Whitaker and Janeane Garofalo that aired on CBS. The show debuted on February 16, 2011, as a spin-off of another series, Criminal Minds, aired on the same network, and is the second show in the Criminal Minds franchise. This edition's profiling team also worked for the Federal Bureau of Investigation's Behavioral Analysis Unit (BAU) in Quantico, Virginia. In an April 2010 episode of Criminal Minds ("The Fight"), during the show's fifth season, the original team met the new team and worked with them to find a San Francisco serial killer, with the episode serving as the new series' backdoor pilot.

Like the parent series, CBS owned the underlying  American rights, while ABC owned the international rights. The series premiered on February 16, 2011, and filled the Wednesday 10:00pm time slot, airing after Criminal Minds.

Due to low ratings, CBS canceled the series on May 17, 2011, and aired its final episode on May 25, 2011. On September 6, 2011, CBS released the complete series as a four-disc set, packaged as "The DVD Edition". There are numerous special features and two episode commentaries with the cast and crew. The set includes the backdoor pilot from season five of the original show. The series is also carried in rerun form on Ion Television as part of their existing agreement to carry Criminal Minds.

Background
In early 2009, Michael Ausiello from Entertainment Weekly said that he and studios were discussing the possibility of a spin-off of the procedural crime drama Criminal Minds. Studio producer Ed Bernero confirmed it by disclosing that "it's safe to say there will be something soon." The show had a completely new cast, with the exception of Kirsten Vangsness, who reprised her role as Penelope Garcia.  By late 2010, the director had been chosen, and the casting completed. It was announced that Forest Whitaker would star. Whitaker's character, Samuel "Sam" "Coop" Cooper, and his team were introduced in Criminal Minds Season 5. Richard Schiff had a recurring role as FBI Director Jack Fickler.

Samuel Cooper and his team set the stage for the spin-off in the 18th episode of the fifth season of Criminal Minds, "The Fight" (April 7, 2010). This "back-door pilot" approach was also used for other CBS shows that were introduced in original series, such as CSI: Miami (2002-2012), CSI: NY (2004-2013), CSI: Cyber (2015-2016), NCIS: Los Angeles (2009–present) and NCIS: New Orleans (2014-2021). Criminal Minds: Suspect Behavior was the first cancellation of CBS spinoffs and CSI: NY was picked up for an eighth season in its place.

Characters
 Forest Whitaker as FBI SSA/ Team Leader Samuel "Sam" Cooper
 Janeane Garofalo as FBI Senior SSA Beth Griffith
 Michael Kelly as FBI Special Agent Jonathan "Prophet" Sims
 Beau Garrett as FBI SSA Gina LaSalle
 Matt Ryan as FBI SSA Mick Rawson
 Kirsten Vangsness as FBI Special Agent Technical Analyst Penelope Garcia
 Richard Schiff as FBI Director Jack Fickler

Episodes

Backdoor pilot episode
This episode was introduced during the fifth-season episodes of Criminal Minds. The Criminal Minds episode "The Fight", served as backdoor pilot episode for the show.

Season 1 (2011)

Home media

Ratings

Reception 
On Rotten Tomatoes, the series has an aggregate score of 42% based on 11 positive and 15 negative critic reviews.  The website’s consensus reads: "With plotlines that are both ludicrous and predictable, Criminal Minds: Suspect Behavior falls victim to audience overfamiliarity."

References

External links

2011 American television series debuts
2011 American television series endings
2010s American crime drama television series
2010s American mystery television series
2010s American police procedural television series
Criminal Minds
CBS original programming
English-language television shows
Television series by ABC Studios
Television series by CBS Studios
American television spin-offs
Television series created by Edward Allen Bernero
Television series by Entertainment One